William Lyle (born 14 April 1984) is a Scottish footballer who plays for Auchinleck Talbot.

Career

Club
A right sided full-back, Lyle joined Ayr United from school in July 2000 and made his first-team debut against Falkirk in August 2002. The player later had a season each at Raith Rovers and Stranraer before signing for Stenhousemuir in July 2007. Lyle remained at Ochilview Park for five seasons, eventually becoming club captain. After his release in 2012, he joined Junior side Auchinleck Talbot with whom he had played at boys club level, years previously.

Lyle signed on with Talbot for another season in June 2013.

International
Lyle was called up to the Scotland Junior international squad in October 2012 for their fixture against the Republic of Ireland.

References

External links

Living people
1984 births
Scottish footballers
Scottish Football League players
Ayr United F.C. players
Raith Rovers F.C. players
Stranraer F.C. players
Stenhousemuir F.C. players
Auchinleck Talbot F.C. players
Association football defenders
Scottish Junior Football Association players